Jay Sures (born 1966) is an American entertainment industry executive and talent agent, currently serving as vice chairman of United Talent Agency.

Early life and education
Born in 1966  in Canada, Sures was raised in Los Angeles. He graduated from the University of California, Los Angeles, where he has also served as an assistant visiting professor for the UCLA School of Theater, Film and Television.

Career
Sures' career with United Talent Agency (UTA) began with the agency's establishment in 1991, working in the mailroom and assisting co-founder Peter Benedek. He became a talent agent when UTA first formed, and was promoted to partner in 1998. Sures joined the board of directors in 2003. He and David Kramer held managing director roles starting in 2010, and both became co-presidents in September 2017. Sures was named vice chairman of UTA in September 2022. Sures is also a co-founder of the UTA Foundation, the agency's non-profit organization.

Sures leads the agency's news, broadcast and television divisions, as well as the acquired Greater Talent Network speakers division. He began managing UTA's news and broadcast division after leading the agency's 2014 acquisition of N.S. Bienstock.

Sures was appointed to the Television Academy's Executive Committee in 2014, and inducted into Broadcasting & Cable Hall of Fame in 2016. In June 2017, Sures and Kramer, along with UTA's chief executive officer, Jeremy Zimmer, ranked number 33 on The Hollywood Reporter list of the 100 "most powerful people in entertainment".

In 2018's and 2022’s Mediaite annual rankings of top players in the news business, Sures was the sole agent recognized.

Throughout his career, Sures has represented David Muir, Henry Bromell, Don Lemon, Anderson Cooper, Steve Levitan, Chuck Lorre, Jen Psaki, Norah O'Donnell, Darren Star, Jake Tapper, Chuck Todd, Elizabeth Vargas, and Larry Wilmore, among others.

Sures led contract negotiations between United Talent Agency and the Writers Guild of America. Focusing primarily on a practice known as packaging, the impasse resulted in a lawsuit and WGA members firing their agents in April 2019. After months of backchannel negotiations, Sures announced that United Talent Agency had reached an agreement with the Writer's Guild, becoming the first major talent agency to do so.

Beginning in 2016, Sures has hosted an annual party in Washington, DC the night before the White House Correspondents Dinner that blends the worlds of politics, entertainment and media.

Personal life
Sures has been married twice and has three daughters, Catherine Sures, Claire Sures, and Emily Sures. He is engaged to fashion model Linda Nyvltova 

Sures is a political activist and a longtime supporter of the Democratic Party. In 2016, he hosted a fundraiser for Senator Tim Kaine, then Hillary Clinton's selection for vice president in the U.S. presidential election. Earlier in the race, he had supported Joe Biden. He pledged his support for Democratic candidate Gavin Newsom in California's 2018 gubernatorial race.

Sures joined the Entertainment Industry Foundation's board of directors in 2008. In 2014, he was honored at Chrysalis' annual Butterfly Ball, which recognizes entertainment professionals for their "creative excellence and philanthropic endeavors".  Sures was appointed to the Regents of the University of California in January 2019 by former Governor Jerry Brown. He was reappointed for a 12-year term by Governor Gavin Newsom in 2020.

In January 2019, it was announced that Sures, along with Rande Gerber and his spouse Cindy Crawford, Mike Meldman, and Jeff Shell would purchase the iconic Hollywood deli, Nate ‘n Al, to keep its doors open after three generations of family ownership.

References

1960s births
Living people
People from Los Angeles
Talent agents
20th-century American Jews
University of California, Los Angeles alumni
University of California regents
21st-century American Jews